Natalie Ann Cassidy (born 13 May 1983) is an English actress. She has played Sonia Fowler in EastEnders since 1993, appeared in the BBC Two sitcom-horror Psychoville and was a contestant on the seventh series of Strictly Come Dancing and the ninth series of Celebrity Big Brother.

Career
As a child, Cassidy attended the Anna Scher Theatre. She joined the cast of EastEnders in 1993, playing Sonia Jackson. In 2006, Cassidy played a rival to Lauren Cooper in an episode of The Catherine Tate Show screened on BBC Two. On 9 April 2006, the BBC announced Cassidy's departure from EastEnders with her final scenes being screened in February 2007. She then concentrated on work in the theatre, appearing in extensive UK tours of The Vagina Monologues, Bedroom Farce and Gertrude's Secret opposite Prunella Scales and a run of The Cherry Orchard at the Chichester Festival Theatre opposite Diana Rigg.

Towards the end of 2007, Cassidy made headlines after losing a lot of weight, and released a fitness DVD entitled Natalie Cassidy's Then and Now Workout. In 2008, she appeared in the documentary Natalie Cassidy's Diet Secrets for BBC Three. In 2008 she appeared as a regular panellist on  The Wright Stuff on Five. Later that year, Cassidy gained press coverage for giving up her diet and regaining considerable weight. In 2009, Cassidy was seen in a supporting role in the BBC Two comedy TV series Psychoville, alongside Dawn French and Eileen Atkins. The first episode was aired in June 2009. She also provided the voice-over for BBC Three's Underage and Pregnant. 

On 25 October 2009, it was announced that Cassidy would reprise her role as Sonia in EastEnders in 2010 with her on screen family Lindsey Coulson who played Carol Jackson, Dean Gaffney who played Robbie Jackson and Devon Anderson as Billie Jackson. The Jackson family were reunited with Patsy Palmer who rejoined the soap in 2008 as Bianca Jackson. Cassidy appeared in a small number of episodes between 8 and 18 February 2010. In 2010, E4 announced that Natalie Cassidy would be starring in her own reality TV show, Natalie Cassidy: Becoming Mum. On 17 December 2010, it was announced that Cassidy would reprise her EastEnders role in 2011 for a single episode. On 5 January 2012, Cassidy entered Celebrity Big Brother and became the fifth evictee. 

In 2012, comedy show Very Important People on Channel 4, featured a spoof reality show segment entitled "Natalie Cassidy Is Doing This Now", which shows its subject engaged in various menial and humorous situations, for example hosing out bins, sorting through old pens, and taking her spare change to Coinstar. Prior to returning to EastEnders, Cassidy was the host of The Health Lottery; a competition broadcast on Channel 5. In 2014, it was announced that Cassidy had decided to make a permanent return to EastEnders, and with the exception of her maternity leave from 2016 to 2017, she has appeared regularly since. 

In August 2020, Cassidy appeared in the BBC comedy series Mandy.

Strictly Come Dancing
In 2009, Cassidy signed up for a series of Strictly Come Dancing, beginning in October. Her professional partner was Vincent Simone and she was voted off the competition in fifth place on 28 November 2009.

Personal life
Between 2009 and 2013, Cassidy was in an on-off relationship with Adam Cottrell, a transport manager from Bristol. They have a daughter together. In 2011, Cottrell was sentenced to 120 hours of unpaid work for attacking Cassidy at their home in Hertfordshire. He had earlier pleaded guilty to assault and criminal damage when he appeared at East Hertfordshire Magistrates' Court. Cottrell was also given a restraining order banning him from contacting the actress for two years. They reunited and became engaged, after Cassidy handed Cottrell a "sober up or leave" ultimatum, but they split permanently in 2013.

Since 2014, Cassidy has been in a relationship with cameraman Marc Humphreys. In October 2015, it was announced that the couple were engaged and a few months later on 13 February 2016, Cassidy revealed she was pregnant with her second child. She gave birth to a daughter in August 2016.

In January 2019 it was announced that she would be running the London Marathon with some of her EastEnders co-stars for a Dementia campaign in honour of Barbara Windsor.

Filmography

Awards and nominations

See also
 List of Celebrity Big Brother (British TV series) housemates
 List of Strictly Come Dancing contestants

References

External links

 
 

1983 births
Living people
Actresses from London
Alumni of the Anna Scher Theatre School
English child actresses
English soap opera actresses
English stage actresses
English television actresses
English television presenters
People from Islington (district)
21st-century English actresses